Mulk is an Indian television drama series based on the partition of India, portraying its effect on the lives of and relationships between three friends from Hindu, Muslim and Sikh background sin Sheikhupura near Lahore Punjab Province . It was first broadcast on Zee TV as the centrepiece of its programming for Republic Day in 2003 and later on the Doordarshan network.

References

Zee TV original programming
2003 Indian television series debuts
Indian drama television series
Television series about the history of India
Indian period television series
Partition of India in fiction
Indian historical television series